The Warner Aerocraft Company is an American aircraft manufacturer based in Seminole, Florida. In the past the company specialized in the design and manufacture of light aircraft in the form of plans and kits for amateur construction, but in recent years has concentrated on a ready-to-fly light-sport aircraft design.

The company's motto is "Puts the Sport in Sport Pilot".

The company started producing plans for the single-seat Warner Revolution I, also called the Spacewalker I. This design was developed into the tandem two-seat Warner Revolution II, also called the Spacewalker II. Both the  Revolution I and II are now out of production.

The most recent development of the basic design is the Warner Sportster light-sport aircraft, first flown in 1999 which, in 2014, is offered as a complete-ready to-fly aircraft with Federal Aviation Administration light-sport approval in progress. The company indicates that kits are not currently available.

Aircraft

References

External links

Aircraft manufacturers of the United States
Ultralight aircraft
Homebuilt aircraft